Rapsani railway station is a railway station near the village of Rapsani, Thessaly, Greece.
Reopened on 7 September 2008. The station is served by both fast Regional trains and Proastiakos to Thessaloniki. Intercity services pass through the station, but do not call at it. The station was formerly called Pyrgetos station because of the small village close to the station.

History
The station originally open in 1916 as part of Evangelismos-Tempi-Rapsani railway, the station building dates from this period. In 1970 OSE became the legal successor to the SEK, taking over responsibilities for most of Greece's rail infrastructure. On 1 January 1971 the station, and most of Greek rail infrastructure where transferred to the Hellenic Railways Organisation S.A., a state-owned corporation. Freight traffic declined sharply when the state-imposed monopoly of OSE for the transport of agricultural products and fertilisers ended in the early 1990s. Many small stations of the network with little passenger traffic were closed down.

In 2001 the infrastructure element of OSE was created, known as GAIAOSE, it would henceforth be responsible for the maintenance, of stations, bridges and other elements of the network, as well as the leasing and the sale of railway assists. In 2003, OSE launched "Proastiakos SA", as a subsidiary to serve the operation of the suburban network in the urban complex of Athens during the 2004 Olympic Games. In 2004 the station and the line closed as part of the upgrades to the Piraeus–Platy Line. Rapsani, and a small section of the Evangelismos-Tempi-Rapsani Line was retained.

In 2005, TrainOSE was created as a brand within OSE to concentrate on rail services and passenger interface. Rapsani station reopened on 7 September 2008, as part of the rollout of Proastiakos services. In 2008, all Proastiakos were transferred from OSE to TrainOSE. Since 2008, the station is served by the Proastiakos Thessaloniki services to New Railway Station. In 2009, with the Greek debt crisis unfolding OSE's Management was forced to reduce services across the network. Timetables were cutback and routes closed, as the government-run entity attempted to reduce overheads. In 2017 OSE's passenger transport sector was privatised as TrainOSE, currently, a wholly owned subsidiary of Ferrovie dello Stato Italiane infrastructure, including stations, remained under the control of OSE.

Facilities
The station is staffed, with a working Booking office (as of 2019) and waiting rooms. There are toilets. The platforms can be reached by a raised walkway accessed by stairs or lifts.

Services
It is served by regional stopping services to Thessaloniki, Kalambaka and Palaiofarsalos. Since 2008, it has been served by Proastiakos Thessaloniki to Larissa and Thessaloniki

Accidents and incidents

Station layout

References

Railway stations in Thessaly
Railway stations opened in 2008
Thessaly Railways